This article lists those who were potential candidates for the Democratic nomination for Vice President of the United States in the 1952 election. After winning the presidential nomination on the third ballot of the 1952 Democratic National Convention, Illinois Governor Adlai Stevenson consulted with Democratic Party leaders such as President Harry S. Truman and Speaker Sam Rayburn. Stevenson chose Alabama Senator John Sparkman, a Southern centrist, as his running mate. Sparkman won the vice presidential nomination on the first ballot as no serious rival tried to displace Stevenson's choice. However, many Northerners were not enthused with the choice of Sparkman due to Sparkman's stance on civil rights. During the 1952 convention, Sparkman, who had supported Senator Richard Russell for president, played a part in watering down the party's platform on civil rights. New York Representative Adam Clayton Powell Jr. and others walked out of the convention after the choice of Sparkman was announced. The Democratic ticket lost the 1952 election to the Republican ticket of Dwight D. Eisenhower and Richard Nixon.

Candidates
Alabama Senator John Sparkman
Oklahoma Senator A. S. Mike Monroney
Vice President Alben W. Barkley
Arkansas Senator J. William Fulbright
Tennessee Senator Estes Kefauver
Oklahoma Senator Robert S. Kerr
Washington Senator Warren Magnuson
Georgia Senator Richard Russell Jr.
Secretary of the Interior Oscar L. Chapman

See also
1952 Democratic National Convention

References

Vice presidency of the United States
1952 United States presidential election